Siwaluh Jabu is a tribal house of the Karo people of Indonesia. Siwaluh jabu also refers to Karo people in ancient times.

References

Karo people
Architecture in Indonesia